Robert Mangion is a former Maltese judge of the family court.

See also
 Judiciary of Malta

References

Living people
20th-century Maltese judges
21st-century Maltese judges
Year of birth missing (living people)
Place of birth missing (living people)